Cinchotannic acid is a tannin contained in many cinchona barks, which by oxidation rapidly yields a dark-coloured phlobaphene called red cinchonic, cinchono-fulvic acid or cinchona red.

References 

Tannins